Attack of the Killer Tomatoes is a 1978 comedy cult film. It may also refer to:

Attack of the Killer Tomatoes: The Animated Series
Attack of the Killer Tomatoes (1986 video game)
Attack of the Killer Tomatoes (1991 video game)

See also 
 Killer tomato (disambiguation)
 Return of the Killer Tomatoes